The Fox Broadcasting Company is an American commercial free-to-air television network owned and operated by the Fox Corporation. 

Though it was officially launched on October 9, 1986, Fox began its official primetime setup on April 5, 1987, with the series Married... with Children and The Tracey Ullman Show airing that night.

Overview

As of October 2012, Fox maintains 19.5 hours of network programming per week. The animated comedy series The Simpsons is one of Fox's most popular shows, becoming the network's first series to rank among the top 30-highest-rated shows of a television season after its original debut, and is the longest running sitcom, as well as animated series, of all time, contributing to the channel's success. According to Lanford Beard of Entertainment Weekly, "The Simpsons have transformed Fox from a small, ignored network into a global network that cannot be ignored. The science fiction television series The X-Files also contributed to the network's success, which led to two spin-offs Millennium and The Lone Gunmen. Fox began airing in high-definition on September 12, 2004, with a series of National Football League (NFL) American football games. Fox had a programming block for children titled Fox Kids, which ran from September 8, 1990 to September 7, 2002.

Unlike the "three larger networks", which aired primetime programming from 8 to 11 p.m. (EST) Mondays to Saturdays and 7 to 11 p.m. (EST) Sundays, Fox has traditionally avoided programming in the 10 p.m. (EST) time interval, leaving that hour to affiliates to program locally (primarily with local newscasts). 

On April 21, 2012, Fox celebrated its 25th-anniversary, with a two-hour television special featuring people related to Fox and its shows. It presented Fox's programs 24, American Idol, Cops, Family Guy, Married... with Children, The Simpsons, and The X-Files, among other programs. The network's adult cartoons are listed under the Animation Domination banner, which is a Sunday night programming block. Fox is a full member of the North American Broadcasters Association (NABA) and the National Association of Broadcasters (NAB).

Current programming

Dramas
9-1-1 (2018)
The Resident (2018)
9-1-1: Lone Star (2020)
Fantasy Island (2021)
The Cleaning Lady (2022)
Alert: Missing Persons Unit (2023)
Accused (2023)

Comedies
Call Me Kat (2021)
Welcome to Flatch (2022)
Animal Control (2023)

Reality/non-scripted
Hell's Kitchen (2005)
So You Think You Can Dance (2005)
Don't Forget the Lyrics! (2007–09; 2022)
MasterChef (2010)
MasterChef Junior (2013)
Beat Shazam (2017)
The Masked Singer (2019)
Lego Masters (2020)
I Can See Your Voice (2020)
Name That Tune (2021)
Crime Scene Kitchen (2021)
Next Level Chef (2022)
Domino Masters (2022)
Special Forces: World's Toughest Test (2023)
Farmer Wants a Wife (2023)

Animated

The Simpsons (1989)
Family Guy (1999–2002; 2005)
Bob's Burgers (2011)
The Great North (2021)
HouseBroken (2021)

Awards shows/beauty pageants
Teen Choice Awards (1999)
iHeartRadio Music Awards (2019)

News
Fox News Sunday (1996)

Saturday mornings

Awesome Planet (2014)
Outer Space (2014)
DIY Sci (2016)
Life 2.0 (2019)
Sci Q (2021)
Second Chance Pets (2021)

Sports

Fox College Football, which includes:
The Big Ten Championship Game
Saturday Game(s) of the Week (featuring the Pac-12 and Big 12 conferences)
The Pac-12 Championship Game (even numbered years)
Fox College Hoops, which includes:
Big East, Big Ten, and Pac-12 regular season games
The Big East Men's Basketball Championship
The Pac-12 Men's Basketball Championship (even numbered years)
MLB on Fox, which includes:
Baseball Night in America
The All Star Game
The American League Championship Series (ALCS) (odd numbered years - shared with FS1)
The National League Championship Series (NLCS) (even numbered years - shared with FS1)
The World Series
NASCAR on Fox, which includes:
The Daytona 500
The GEICO 500
The Coca-Cola 600
Numerous other races (either on Saturday nights or Sunday afternoons)
NFL on Fox, which includes:
Fox NFL Sunday
The OT
NFC games (and interconference games when the NFC team is the road team)
The NFC Championship Game
The Super Bowl (every four years)
Fox Soccer, which includes:
UEFA European Championship (once every four years)
FIFA World Cup (once every four years)
Boxing on Fox
PBA on Fox
WWE SmackDown (2019)
USFL (2022)

Upcoming programming

Reality/non-scripted
Gordon Ramsay's Food Stars (TBA)

Animation
Grimsburg (2022–23 season)
Krapopolis (2023–24 season)
Universal Basic Guys/The Hoagie Bros. (2024)

Pilots

Animation
Bedrock

In development

Dramas
13 Songs
Archie & Pete
Billionaire Class
The Bomb Maker
End of Watch
Hell or High Water
The Incident
Jenny Is a Weapon
The Lost Apothecary
Red Widow
Starsky & Hutch
Untitled undercover FBI drama series
Untitled Port Authority drama series
Untitled series based on Doc – Nelle tue mani
White House Doctor

Comedies
Buffalo Tens
Cindy Snow
Dicks
El Patio
Get Buckets
Guards
Guys We F****d
I Gotta Ask My Wife
No. 1 Supreme Citizen of America
Remix
Rock Camp
Untitled Michelle Nader project

Animation
Bloom County
Clue
Cocky
Dirt Girls
Hawkmaster
His Majesty's Dragon
NIMH
The Movers
Prince Wawa
Shell Beach

Anthology
Untitled Huey Lewis project
Icon

Reality/non-scripted
Fame or Fortune
Untitled Bad Moms project
Untitled Tom Brady project

Former programming

Animation
The Critic (1995; first season aired on ABC)
King of the Hill (1997–2009; four episodes produced for season 13 were syndicated in 2010)
The PJs (1999–2000; moved to The WB)
Futurama (1999–2003; moved to Comedy Central, then Hulu)
American Dad! (2005–14; moved to TBS)
Sit Down, Shut Up (2009; based on the Australian series of the same name)
The Cleveland Show (2009–13)
Allen Gregory (2011)
Napoleon Dynamite (2012)
Bordertown (2016)
Bless the Harts (2019–21)
Duncanville (2020–22; moved to Hulu for a shortened fourth and final season)

Animation Domination High-Def 
Axe Cop (2013–14, moved to FXX)
Golan the Insatiable (2013–14, first season)
High School USA! (2013)
Lucas Bros. Moving Co. (2013–14, moved to FXX)

Children's programming

Action Man (2000–02)
The Adrenaline Project (2007–08)
The Adventures of Dynamo Duck (1992-94)
A.J.'s Time Travelers (1994)
Alien Racers (2005)
Alienators: Evolution Continues (2001–02)
Alvin and the Chipmunks (1992–93, reruns only)
Angela Anaconda (2000) 
Animaniacs (1993–95, moved to Kids' WB)
Attack of the Killer Tomatoes (1990–92)
The Avengers: United They Stand (1999–2000)
Batman: The Animated Series (1992–95)
Beast Machines: Transformers (1999–2000)
Beast Wars: Transformers (1999–2000) 
Beetleborgs Metallix (1997–98)
Beetlejuice (1991)
Big Bad Beetleborgs (1996–97)
Big Guy and Rusty the Boy Robot (1999–01)
Bill & Ted's Excellent Adventures (1991–92)
Bobby's World (1990–98)
Bratz (2005–07)
Budgie the Little Helicopter (1995–96)
C Bear and Jamal (1996–97)
Chaotic (2006–08)
The Cramp Twins (2003–06)
Cubix: Robots for Everyone (2003–04)
Cybersix (1999)
Cyberchase (2002–08)
Defenders of Dynatron City (1992)
Di-Gata Defenders (2007–08)
Digimon Adventure (1999–2000)
Digimon Adventure 02 (2000–01)
Digimon Tamers (2001–02) 
Dinosaur King (2007–08)
Dinozaurs (2000)
Dog City (1992–95)
Donkey Kong Country (1998–99)
Droopy, Master Detective (1993–94)
Dungeons and Dragons (2000)
Eek! The Cat (1992–97)
Eerie, Indiana (1997)
Eerie, Indiana: The Other Dimension (1998–99)
Escaflowne (2000)
F-Zero: GP Legend (2004–05)
Fighting Foodons (2002–03)
Flint the Time Detective (2000–01)
Fun House (1990–91)
Funky Cops (2003–08)
Galidor: Defenders of the Outer Dimension (2002)
George of the Jungle (1992)
Ghostwriter (1992)
G.I. Joe: Sigma 6 (2005–06)
Godzilla: The Series (1998–2000)
Goosebumps (1995–98)
The Incredible Crash Dummies (1993)
Jim Henson's Animal Show (1994–96)
Johnson and Friends (1994–96)
Kirby: Right Back at Ya! (2002–06)
Kong: The Animated Series (2001)
Life with Louie (1995–98)
Little Shop (1991–92)
Little Dracula (1991)
Los Luchadores (2001–02)
Mad Jack the Pirate (1998–99)
Magic Adventures of Mumfie (1995–96)
The Magic School Bus (1996–2000)
Magical DoReMi (2005–06)
The Magician (1999)
Masked Rider (1995–96, moved to syndication)
Medabots (2001–02)
Merrie Melodies Starring Bugs Bunny and Friends (1991–94)
Mew Mew Power (2005–06)
Mighty Morphin Alien Rangers (miniseries) (1996)
Mighty Morphin Power Rangers (1993–95)
Mighty Mouse: The New Adventures (1992)
Mon Colle Knights (2001–02)
Moolah Beach (2001)
Monster Rancher (1999-02)
Mowgli: The New Adventures of the Jungle Book (1998) 
The Mr. Potato Head Show (1998–99)
Muppet Babies (1991–92, reruns only)
Mystic Knights of Tir Na Nog (1998–99)
NASCAR Racers (1999–2001)
Ned's Newt (1998–99)
The New Woody Woodpecker Show (1999–02)
Ninja Turtles: The Next Mutation (1997–98)
Oggy and the Cockroaches (1998–99)
One Piece (2004–06)
Peter Pan and the Pirates (1990–91)
Piggsburg Pigs! (1990–91)
Pirate Islands (2004)
The Plucky Duck Show (1992–93)
Power Rangers in Space (1998)
Power Rangers Lightspeed Rescue (2000)
Power Rangers Lost Galaxy (1999)
Power Rangers Time Force (2001)
Power Rangers Turbo (1997)
Power Rangers Wild Force (2002, moved to ABC Kids)
Power Rangers Zeo (1996)
Red Planet (1994)
The Ripping Friends (2001–02)
Roswell Conspiracies: Aliens, Myths and Legends (2001)
Round the Twist (1997)
Sam & Max: Freelance Police!!! (1997–98)
The Secret Files of the Spy Dogs (1998–99)
Shaman King (2003–05)
Sherlock Holmes in the 22nd Century (1999–2000)
Silver Surfer (1998)
Solarman (1992–93)
Sonic X (2003–06)
Space Goofs (1997–99)
Spider-Man (1994–98)
Spider-Man Unlimited (1999–2001)
The Spooktacular New Adventures of Casper (1996–98)
Stargate Infinity (2002–03)
Stickin' Around (1997–98)
Super Dave: Daredevil for Hire (1992–93)
Swamp Thing (1991–92)
Taz-Mania (1991–95)
Teenage Mutant Ninja Turtles (2003–07, moved to The CW)
The Tick (1994–96)
Thunderbirds (1994)
Tiny Toon Adventures (1992–95)
Tom & Jerry Kids (1990–93)
Toonsylvania (1998–99)
Transformers: Robots in Disguise (2001–02)
Ultraman Tiga (2002–03)
Ultimate Muscle (2002–04)
Viva Piñata (2006–08)
Where on Earth Is Carmen Sandiego? (1994–98)
Winx Club (2004–08)
WMAC Masters (2003)
X-Men (1992–97)
Xuxa (1993)
Xyber 9: New Dawn (1999)
Young Hercules (1998-1999)
Yu-Gi-Oh! (2006–07)
Yu-Gi-Oh! GX (2007–08)
Zazoo U (1990–91)

Dramas
21 Jump Street (1987–90)
Werewolf (1987–88)
Dirty Dozen: The Series (1988)
Alien Nation (1989–90)
Booker (1989–90)
The Outsiders (1990)
Glory Days (1990)
D.E.A. (1990)
Against the Law (1990–91)
Beverly Hills, 90210 (1990–2000)
Sightings (1992–93)
Melrose Place (1992–99)
The Heights (1992)
Likely Suspects (1992–93)
Class of '96 (1993)
Key West (1993)
TriBeCa (1993)
The Adventures of Brisco County, Jr. (1993–94)
The X-Files (1993–2002; 2016; 2018)
South Central (1994)
Encounters (1994–1996)
Models Inc. (1994–95)
M.A.N.T.I.S. (1994)
Fortune Hunter (1994)
New York Undercover (1994–98)
Party of Five (1994–2000)
The Great Defender (1995)
VR.5 (1995)
Medicine Ball (1995)
Sliders (1995–98)
Strange Luck (1995–96)
Space: Above and Beyond (1995–96)
Kindred: The Embraced (1996)
Profit (1996)
L.A. Firefighters (1996)
Millennium (1996–99)
Lawless (1997)
Pacific Palisades (1997)
Beyond Belief: Fact or Fiction (1997–2002)
Roar (1997)
Ally McBeal (1997–2002)
413 Hope St. (1997–98)
The Visitor (1997–98)
Significant Others (1998)
Brimstone (1998–99)
Get Real (1999–2000)
Harsh Realm (1999–2000)
Ryan Caulfield: Year One (1999)
Time of Your Life (1999–2000)
Opposite Sex (2000)
Dark Angel (2000–02)
FreakyLinks (2000–01)
Boston Public (2000–04)
The Street (2000)
The Lone Gunmen (2001)
Night Visions (2001)
Pasadena (2001)
24 (2001–10; 2014)
The American Embassy (2002)
Fastlane (2002–03)
Firefly (2002)
John Doe (2002–03)
Girls Club (2002)
Keen Eddie (2003–04)
The O.C. (2003–07)
Skin (2003)
Tru Calling (2003–05)
Wonderfalls (2004)
The Jury (2004)
North Shore (2004–05)
House (2004–12)
Jonny Zero (2005)
Point Pleasant (2005)
The Inside (2005)
Reunion (2005)
Prison Break (2005–09; 2017)
Bones (2005–17)
Head Cases (2005)
Killer Instinct (2005)
Vanished (2006)
Justice (2006–07)
Standoff (2006–07)
The Wedding Bells (2007)
Drive (2007)
K-Ville (2007)
Terminator: The Sarah Connor Chronicles (2008–09)
New Amsterdam (2008)
Canterbury's Law (2008)
Fringe (2008–13)
Lie to Me (2009–11)
Dollhouse (2009–10)
Glee (2009–15)
Mental (2009)
Human Target (2010–11)
Past Life (2010)
The Good Guys (2010)
Lone Star (2010)
The Chicago Code (2011)
Terra Nova (2011)
The Finder (2012)
Alcatraz (2012)
Touch (2012–13)
The Mob Doctor (2012–13)
The Following (2013–15)
Sleepy Hollow (2013–17)
Almost Human (2013–14)
Rake (2014)
Gang Related (2014)
Red Band Society (2014–15)
Gotham (2014–19)
Gracepoint (2014)
Empire (2015–20)
Backstrom (2015)
Wayward Pines (2015–16)
Minority Report (2015)
Scream Queens (2015–16)
Rosewood (2015–17)
Second Chance (2016)
Lucifer (2016–18) (moved to Netflix)
Houdini & Doyle (2016)
Lethal Weapon (2016–19)
Pitch (2016)
The Exorcist (2016–17)
Star (2016–19)
24: Legacy (2017)
APB (2017)
Shots Fired (2017)
The Orville (2017–19) (moved to Hulu)
The Gifted (2017–19)
The Passage (2019)
Proven Innocent (2019)
BH90210 (2019)
Almost Family (2019–20)
Prodigal Son (2019–21)
Deputy (2020)
Filthy Rich (2020)
Next (2020)
The Big Leap (2021)
Our Kind of People (2021–22)
Monarch (2022)

Game shows
Family Double Dare (1988)
Fun House (1990–91)
Big Deal (1996)
Guinness World Records Primetime (1998–2001)
Greed (1999–2000)
It's Your Chance of a Lifetime (2000)
The Chamber (2002)
The Rich List (2006)
 My GamesFever (2006–07)
Are You Smarter than a 5th Grader? (2007–09; 2015)
The Moment of Truth (2008)
Hole in the Wall (2008–09)
Million Dollar Money Drop (2010–11)
Take Me Out (2012)
Riot (2014)
Bullseye (2015)
Boom! (2015)
Love Connection (2017–18)
Mental Samurai (2019–21)
Spin the Wheel (2019)
Cherries Wild (2021)
Game of Talents (2021)

Late night
The Late Show (1986–87; 1988)
The Wilton North Report (1987–88)
The Chevy Chase Show (1993)
House of Buggin' (1995)
Mad TV (1995–2009) (moved to The CW in 2016)
Saturday Night Special (1996)
Talkshow with Spike Feresten (2006–09)
The Wanda Sykes Show (2009–10)
 Party Over Here (2016)

News
 Front Page (1993)
 Fox After Breakfast (1996)
 The Huckabee Show (2010)

Reality shows and talent competitions
America's Most Wanted (1988–2011; 2021)
The Reporters (1988–90)
Beyond Tomorrow (1988–90)
Cops (1989–2013, moved to Spike/Paramount Network; currently on Fox Nation)
Totally Hidden Video (1989–92)
Best of the Worst (1991–92)
What's So Funny? (1995)
The World's Funniest! (1997)
World's Wildest Police Videos (1998–2002)
Temptation Island (2001–03)
Boot Camp (2001)
Murder in Small Town X (2001)
Love Cruise (2001)
American Idol (2002–16, moved to ABC in 2018)
Invasion of the Hidden Cameras (2002)
30 Seconds to Fame (2002–03)
Anything for Love (2003)
Joe Millionaire (2003; 2022)
Married by America (2003)
Mr. Personality (2003)
American Juniors (2003)
Paradise Hotel (2003; 2019)
The Simple Life (2003–05)
Renovate My Family (2004–05)
My Big Fat Obnoxious Fiance (2004)
The Littlest Groom (2004)
Forever Eden (2004)
The Swan (2004)
Playing It Straight (2004)
The Casino (2004)
Trading Spouses (2004–07)
The Complex: Malibu (2004)
Nanny 911 (2004–07)
My Big Fat Obnoxious Boss (2004)
The Rebel Billionaire: Branson's Quest for the Best (2004)
Who's Your Daddy? (2005)
The Princes of Malibu (2005)
Skating with Celebrities (2006)
Unan1mous (2006)
Celebrity Duets (2006)
On the Lot (2007)
Anchorwoman (2007)
Nashville (2007)
Kitchen Nightmares (2007–14)
The Next Great American Band (2007)
More to Love (2009)
Mobbed (2011–13)
Buried Treasure (2011)
The X Factor (2011–13)
Q'Viva! The Chosen (2012)
The Choice (2012) 
Hotel Hell (2012–16)
Does Someone Have to Go? (2013)
Utopia (2014)
I Wanna Marry "Harry" (2014)
World's Funniest (2015)
Knock Knock Live (2015)
Home Free (2015–16)
Miss USA (2016–19)
Superhuman (2016–17)
American Grit (2016–17)
Coupled (2016)
Showtime at the Apollo (2016–17 as a series of specials, 2018 as a regular series)
My Kitchen Rules (2017)
Kicking & Screaming (2017)
You the Jury (2017)
The F Word (2017)
The Four: Battle for Stardom (2018)
Gordon Ramsay's 24 Hours to Hell and Back (2018–20)
First Responders Live (2019)
What Just Happened??! with Fred Savage (2019)
Flirty Dancing (2019–20)
The Masked Singer: After the Mask (2020)
Ultimate Tag (2020)
Labor of Love (2020)
Celebrity Watch Party (2020)
The Masked Dancer (2020–21)
Holmes Family Effect (2021)
Alter Ego (2021)
The Real Dirty Dancing (2022)

Miniseries and Docuseries
American Chronicles (1990)
Yearbook (1991)
Love and Betrayal: The Mia Farrow Story (1995)
The Invaders (1995)
Fox Files (1998)
American High (2000)
Cosmos: A Spacetime Odyssey (2014)
Cosmos: Possible Worlds (2020)

Sitcoms
Married... with Children (1987–97)
Duet (1987–89)
Down and Out in Beverly Hills (1987)
Mr. President (1987–88)
Karen's Song (1987)
The New Adventures of Beans Baxter (1987)
Second Chance (aka Boys Will Be Boys) (1987–89)
Women in Prison (1987)
Open House (1989–90)
Molloy (1990)
Parker Lewis Can't Lose (1990–93)
True Colors (1990–92)
Babes (1990–91)
Get a Life (1990–92)
Good Grief (1990–91)
Top of the Heap (1991)
Roc (1991–94)
Herman's Head (1991–94)
Charlie Hoover (1991)
Drexell's Class (1991–92)
Stand by Your Man (1992)
Down the Shore (1992–93)
Vinnie & Bobby (1992)
Bill & Ted's Excellent Adventures (1992)
Rachel Gunn, R.N. (1992)
Martin (1992–97)
Flying Blind (1992–93)
Woops! (1992)
Great Scott! (1992)
Shaky Ground (1992–93)
Danger Theatre (1993)
Living Single (1993–98)
Daddy Dearest (1993)
Bakersfield P.D. (1993–94)
The Sinbad Show (1993–94)
Monty (1994)
The George Carlin Show (1994–95)
Hardball (1994)
Wild Oats (1994)
Get Smart (1995)
My Wildest Dreams (1995)
The Crew (1995–96)
The Preston Episodes (1995)
Ned & Stacey (1995–97)
Partners (1995–96)
Misery Loves Company (1995)
Too Something (1995–96)
Local Heroes (1996)
The Last Frontier (1996)
Lush Life (1996)
Party Girl (1996)
Love and Marriage (1996)
 The Show (1996)
Pauly (1997)
Between Brothers (1997–98)
Ask Harriet (1998)
Damon (1998)
Getting Personal (1998)
Holding the Baby (1998)
That '70s Show (1998–2006)
Living in Captivity (1998)
Costello (1998)
Action (1999; moved to American Network)
Ally (1999; moved to American Network)
Malcolm in the Middle (2000–06)
Titus (2000–02)
Normal, Ohio (2000)
Grounded for Life (2001–02) (Moved to The WB)
Undeclared (2001–02)
The Tick (2001–02)
The Bernie Mac Show (2001–06)
That '80s Show (2002)
Andy Richter Controls the Universe (2002–03)
Greg the Bunny (2002)
Oliver Beene (2003–04)
Wanda at Large (2003)
The Pitts (2003)
Luis (2003)
A Minute with Stan Hooper (2003)
Arrested Development (2003–06; moved to Netflix in 2013)
Cracking Up (2004)
Method & Red (2004)
Quintuplets (2004–05)
Life on a Stick (2005)
Stacked (2005–06)
Kitchen Confidential (2005)
The War at Home (2005–07)
Free Ride (2006)
The Loop (2006–07)
Happy Hour (2006)
'Til Death (2006–10)
The Winner (2007)
Back to You (2007–08)
Unhitched (2008)
The Return of Jezebel James (2008)
Do Not Disturb (2008)
Brothers (2009)
Sons of Tucson (2010)
Raising Hope (2010–14)
Running Wilde (2010)
Traffic Light (2011)
Breaking In (2011–12)
I Hate My Teenage Daughter (2011–12)
New Girl (2011–18)
Ben and Kate (2012–13)
The Mindy Project (2012–15, moved to Hulu)
Brooklyn Nine-Nine (2013–18; moved to NBC) 
Dads (2013–14)
The Goodwin Games (2013)
Enlisted (2014)
Surviving Jack (2014)
Mulaney (2014–15)
The Last Man on Earth (2015–18)
Weird Loners (2015)
Grandfathered (2015–16)
The Grinder (2015–16)
Cooper Barrett's Guide to Surviving Life (2016)
Son of Zorn (2016–17)
The Mick (2017–18)
Making History (2017)
Ghosted (2017–18)
LA to Vegas (2018)
Last Man Standing (2018–21; moved from ABC)
Rel (2018–19)
The Cool Kids (2018–19)
The Moodys (2019–21)
Outmatched (2020)
Pivoting (2022)

Sports
Saturday Night's Main Event (1992)
NHL on Fox (1994–99)
Barclays Premier League (1999-2013)
Cotton Bowl Classic (1999–2014)
Celebrity Boxing (2002)
Man vs. Beast (2003–04)
Formula One Racing (2007–12)
UFC on Fox (2011–18)
Thursday Night Football (2018–21; moved to Amazon Prime Video)
XFL (2020)
Major League Soccer (2003–2011, 2015–2022)

Variety and sketch comedy
The Tracey Ullman Show (1987–90)
Comic Strip Live (1989–94)
In Living Color (1990–94)
Haywire (1990–91)
The Sunday Comics (1991)
The Edge (1992–93)
The Ben Stiller Show (1992–93)
Townsend Television (1993)
Cedric the Entertainer Presents (2002–03)
Kelsey Grammer Presents: The Sketch Show (2005)
Osbournes Reloaded (2009)
In the Flow with Affion Crockett (2011)
Let's Be Real (2021)

Specials
Billboard Music Awards (1990-2006)
Springfield's Most Wanted (1995)
Alien Nation: Millennium (1996)
Nick Fury: Agent of S.H.I.E.L.D. (1998)
The Night of the Headless Horseman (1999)
Olive, the Other Reindeer (1999)
Miss Earth (2001–present)
Baywatch: Hawaiian Wedding (2003)
Fox News Specials (2004-2008)
24: Redemption (2008)
Laugh It Up, Fuzzball: The Family Guy Trilogy (2007–2010)
The Simpsons 20th Anniversary Special – In 3-D! On Ice! (2010)
Night of the Hurricane (2011)
Ice Age: A Mammoth Christmas (2011)
Ice Age: The Great Egg-Scapade (2016)
Miss Universe (2015–19; 2021)
Miss USA (2015—2019)

Notes

References

General
 McNeil, Alex (1996). Total Television (4th ed). New York: Penguin Books. .
 Brooks, Tim; Marsh, Earle (2007). The Complete Directory to Prime Time Network and Cable TV Shows (9th ed.). New York: Ballantine. .

Specific

External links
 List of programs broadcast by Fox at Fox.com

Fox